Steven Venner (born 5 September 1969) is a former Australian rules footballer who played for North Melbourne in the Victorian Football League (VFL) in 1989. He was recruited from Sebastopol, a suburb of Ballarat. After being delisted by North, Venner crossed to Williamstown in the VFA where he played 42 games and kicked 5 goals from 1992-94, including the 1992 grand final against Sandringham at Princes Park.

References

External links

Living people
1969 births
North Melbourne Football Club players
Australian rules footballers from Victoria (Australia)